Raymond Knight is the name of:

Ray Knight (rodeo organizer) (1872–1947), rodeo performer and American settler of Alberta
Raymond Knight (radio) (1899–1953), American radio comedian
Raymond L. Knight (1922–1945), American aviator

See also
Ray Knight (born 1952), American baseball player